Sabang may refer to:
 Sabang, Aceh, the westernmost and northernmost city of Indonesia
 Sabang, Paschim Medinipur, village with a police station, in Paschim Medinipur district, West Bengal, India
 Sabang (community development block), division in Paschim Medinipur district, West Bengal, India
 Sabang Merauke Raya Air Charter, an airline based in Medan, North Sumatra, Indonesia
 Sabang, Cabayugan, village in the Philippines
 Sabang (Vidhan Sabha constituency), assembly constituency in West Bengal, India
 Sabangan, Mountain Province, municipality in Mountain Province, Philippines
 Sabang Beach, in Puerto Galera, Oriental Mindoro, Philippines
 Sabang, San Jose, a coastal barangay in San Jose, Camarines Sur, Philippines